Chris Wittman (born 30 August 1965) is a former Australian rules footballer who played with Hawthorn and St Kilda in the VFL/AFL.

Originally from Xavier College, Wittman played mostly as a rover for Hawthorn. He kicked 33 goals in 1988 and played in their premiership side that year. However, he broke his arm early in the game and took no further part. He finished as a premiership player again the following season. After not getting enough games due to the strength of Hawthorn during the early 1990s, he was traded to St Kilda, where he spent his final season.

References

Hawksheadquarters profile

1965 births
Living people
Hawthorn Football Club players
Hawthorn Football Club Premiership players
St Kilda Football Club players
Australian rules footballers from Victoria (Australia)
People educated at Xavier College
Two-time VFL/AFL Premiership players